Jules Müller is a Luxembourgian former football manager. With Jean-Pierre Hoscheid and Albert Reuter he co-managed the Luxembourg national football team from 1948 until 1949. They managed Luxembourg in the football tournament of the 1948 Summer Olympic Games where Luxembourg were eliminated in the first round 6–1 by Yugoslavia.

References

External links
 Profile on eu-football.info

Year of birth missing
Possibly living people
Luxembourgian football managers
Luxembourg national football team managers